Buzzard Run is a stream located entirely within Ritchie County, West Virginia. It is a tributary of Lynncamp Run.

Buzzard Run was descriptively named by the Native Americans (Indians).

See also
List of rivers of West Virginia

References

Rivers of Ritchie County, West Virginia
Rivers of West Virginia